Association football is the most popular sport in Argentina and part of the culture in the country. It is the one with the most players (2,658,811 total, 331,811 of which are registered and 2,327,000 unregistered; with 3,650 clubs and 37,161 officials, all according to FIFA) and is the most popular recreational sport, played from childhood into old age. The percentage of Argentines that declare allegiance to an Argentine football club is about 90%.

Football was introduced to Argentina in the later half of the 19th century by the British immigrants in Buenos Aires. The first Argentine league was contested in 1891, making it the fifth-oldest recognised league of a FIFA member (after England, Scotland, Northern Ireland and the Netherlands). The Argentine Football Association (AFA) was formed in 1893 and is the eighth-oldest in the world.

The Argentina national team is one of the eight to have won the FIFA World Cup, having done so in 1978, 1986, and 2022, while being runner-up in 1930, 1990 and 2014. Argentina has also won the top continental tournament, the Copa América, 15 times, and the FIFA Confederations Cup in 1992. It also holds the record for having more official titles than any other nation with 22. The nation's Olympic representative has won two Gold Medals (in 2004 and 2008), while the under-20 team has won a record six U-20 World Cups. At club level, Argentine teams have won the most Intercontinental Cups (9) and the most Copa Libertadores (25).

Women's football has a national league since 1991, the Campeonato de Fútbol Femenino. In turn, the female national representative qualified for the World Cup for the first time in 2007 and won their first Campeonato Sudamericano Femenino (top continental competition) in 2006.

In futsal, Argentina were FIFUSA/AMF Futsal World Cup champions in 1994 and 2019. They also compete in the FIFA code of futsal, where they finished champions in 2016, runner-up in 2021 and fourth place in 2004. The team also won the FIFA Futsal Copa América in 2003, 2015 and 2022. Moreover, Argentina was world champion in futsal for the visually impaired in 2002 and 2006, and also won the Gold Medal at the IBSA World Blind Games 2015, a Silver Medal (2004) and two Bronze (2008 and 2016) in the Paralympic Games, three runner-up world championships (1998, 2000 and 2014), three championships of the Copa América (1999, 2005, 2017), three Silver Medals in the Parapan American Games (2007, 2011, 2015) and two runners-up of the Copa América (2009 and 2013).

Argentina also compete in the beach football World Cup, where their best finish was third in 2001.

History

The beginning 

By 1867, there was a large British community in Buenos Aires. Most of them had established themselves in Argentina coming from the United Kingdom as managers and workers of the British-owned railway companies that operated in Argentina. British citizens founded social and sports clubs where they could practise their sports, such as bowls, cricket, football, golf, horse riding, rugby union and tennis amongst others.

Two English immigrants, Thomas and James Hogg, organized a meeting on 9 May 1867 in Buenos Aires where the Buenos Aires Football Club was founded. The club was given permission by the Buenos Aires Cricket Club to make use of the cricket field in Parque Tres de Febrero, Palermo, Buenos Aires, on the site now occupied by the Galileo Galilei planetarium. The first recorded football match in Argentina took place on this pitch on 20 June 1867,<ref>[https://www.rsssf.org/tablesa/arg-early-info.html "Early History of Football in Argentina'"] - RSSSF by Osvaldo J. Georgazzi, 1999</ref> being covered by English language daily newspaper The Standard. This newspaper, published in Argentina, was the first one to cover football matches in the country. That first match, originally scheduled for May 25 in La Boca, had to be postponed due to bad weather.

The match started at 12.30 and was played between two teams of British merchants, the White Caps and the Red Caps. (In the 19th century, it was common practice for teams to be distinguished by caps rather than shirts). The teams consisted of eight players each as the organisers were unable to find more players for the match. The line-ups were: Thomas Hogg, James Hogg, William Forrester, T. B. Smith, J. W. Bond, E. S. Smith, J. Rabsbottom and N. H. Smith (one team); William Heald, T. R. Best, U. Smith, H. J. Barge, H. Willmont, R. M. Ramsay, J. Simpson and W. Boschetti (second team). The team led by Hogg won 4–0, according to The Standard newspaper published on June 23. The match played was a blend of both association and rugby footballs, with no goals on the field. The use of hands was also allowed.150 años del primer partido de fútbol en Argentina by Jorge Gallego on Telam, 20 June 2017

The first chronicle of a football match written in Spanish was published by local newspaper El Nacional on September 11, 1880. The chronicle referred to a "foot-ball" match played in a cricket field in Montevideo between an Uruguayan-Argentine combined vs a British team. The attendance was estimated in 1,000 people. Nevertheless, it is unclear what form of "football" was played due to the number of players on the field (15 per side).

The "Southern Railway Athletic Club" (not related with the British railway company) might have been the first organised team under the "Association" rules, according to The Standard, that published a chronicle describing the existence of that team, with records of a match played at Lanús A.C. field in 1888. The chronicle also named Alexander Watson Hutton as one of the GSRFC players. The early matches of the team, in fact, were against Buenos Aires English High School.

 First league and development 
The so-called "father of Argentine football" was a Glaswegian schoolteacher Alexander Watson Hutton, who first taught football at St Andrew's School in Buenos Aires in the early 1880s. On 4 February 1884, he founded the Buenos Aires English High School, where he continued to instruct the pupils in the game. In 1891, the "Association Argentine Football League" was established by F.L. Wooley, with Alex Lamont of St. Andrew's Scots School as one of its members. The AAFL was the first football league outside of the British Isles. Five clubs competed but only one season was ever played.

In this early period, a number of football clubs were set up by the employees of the various British-owned railway companies in Argentina and a number of these teams have survived to the present day, including Ferro Carril Oeste, Ferrocarril Midland, Rosario Central and Talleres.

A new league with the same name as its predecessor, was formed on 21 February 1893. It eventually became the Argentine Football Association (AFA). In these early days of football in Argentina, nearly all of the players and officials were expatriate Britons or of British extraction and the oldest football clubs in Argentina like Rosario Central, Newell's Old Boys and Quilmes were all founded by British expatriates.

The most successful and admired team of this early period was Alumni, founded by graduates and students of Watson Hutton's English High School. Like all of the early clubs, it was composed mainly of British players.

Towards the end of the 19th century, the game became increasingly popular amongst other European immigrants, especially Italians.

Most of the early clubs had a policy of excluding the local creole population. The backlash against this policy at Quilmes Athletic Club resulted in the formation of Argentino de Quilmes in 1899, the first of many Argentine clubs for Argentine players. The name Argentino or Argentinos has remained popular in Argentine football. The most famous team with the name is Argentinos Juniors who won the Copa Libertadores in 1985.

British football clubs tours over South America contributed to the spread and develop of football in Argentina during the first years of the 20th century. The first club to tour on the country was Southampton F.C. in 1904 who were captained by George Molyneaux. They beat the Buenos Aires High School Alumni team 3-0 with Molyneaux remarking 'how far the Argentines were ahead of their European counterparts in France and Denmark.' Several other teams came afterwards (mainly from England although some Scotland clubs also visited South America) until 1929 with Chelsea F.C. being the last team to tour.

British teams were considered the best in the world by then, and some of them served as inspiration to establish football clubs in Argentina, helped by the immigration of British citizens that had arrived to work for British companies (mostly in railway construction). Belgrano A.C., Rosario A.C., Alumni and Quilmes are some examples of clubs established by British immigrants to South America.Plaza Jewell, el club donde nació el deporte rosarino, cumple hoy 145 años, La Capital, 27 Mar 2012

 Consolidation 
The early years of the 20th century saw a large number of new clubs formed; by 1907, there were over 300 teams in Argentina. Most of the major clubs were created around this period; they played in the national amateur tournament or in local championships. By this time, matches had a considerable attendance and as the popularity of the game increased the British influence on the game waned. In 1911, Alumni folded and by 1912 the Association was renamed in Spanish as the Asociación Argentina de Football, although the tradition of giving the clubs English names continued for many years.

During the early 20th century, many new football leagues were started in cities across Argentina as the popularity of the game spread out from Greater Buenos Aires, these include Rosario (with the establishment of Liga Rosarina in 1905), Córdoba (1912), Santa Fe (1913), Tucumán (1919), San Luis (1920) and Salta (1921).

Although the city of Rosario did not have an organised league, since 1900 the football squads of Rosario A.C. and Rosario Central had taken part of the first international tournament in South America, the Tie Cup, played by teams of Rosario, Buenos Aires and Uruguay leagues. Rosario A.C. became the first Rosarian team to win an international competition after winning the cup in 1902, defeating legendary Alumni 2–1 in the playoff match. The squad would win two cups else, in 1904 (beating Uruguayan CURCC 3–2) and 1905 (winning over CURCC again by 4–3) editions, totalling three championships in six years.

Teams from Rosario had also participated in the first National Cups organised by the Argentine Football Association, such as Copa de Honor Municipalidad de Buenos Aires, (which Newell's Old Boys and Rosario Central would later win in 1911 and 1916 respectively)

The first official match played by the Argentina national team took place on 16 May 1901 against Uruguay, a 3–2 win for Argentina. This game marked the beginning of the Argentina and Uruguay football rivalry.

The first trophy won by Argentina was the Copa Lipton in 1905. They won their first tournament in 1910 (Copa Centenario de la Revolución de Mayo) which was contested between Argentina, Uruguay, Brazil and Chile.

In 1916, Argentina competed in the first Copa América which was won by Uruguay. Argentina would win the tournament for the first time in 1921, and have gone on to win it a total of 15 times.

During the 1920s decade, Huracan was a strong competitor, winning most of the annual championships, as Racing Club did during the 1910s. To mention a tradition, the Huracán footballers and fans used to meet at the historical Japanese Cafe.

In 1928, Argentina Olympic football team competed at the 1928 Olympics in Amsterdam, where they finished runners-up to Uruguay. Two years later, they competed in the first FIFA World Cup, again finishing runners up to hosts Uruguay.

Following two seasons of disrupted play due to mass cancellation and suspension of matches and the mid-season withdrawal of teams in the 1929, and 1930, 18 teams decided to form a breakaway professional league for the 1931 season. The amateur league carried on in parallel until it folded in 1934 with many of the teams joining the new professional second division The creation of the professional league helped curb the exodus of Argentine talent to high paying European football clubs. The 1934 World Cup Italy national team championship side featured several Oriundo in the squad composed of Argentine-born players such as Raimundo Orsi, Enrique Guaita, and Luis Monti who also played for Argentina in the 1930 World Cup.

In 1964, Independiente became the first Argentine club to win the Copa Libertadores, Argentine clubs have won the competition a total of 25 times.

In 1967, Racing became the first Argentine team to win the Intercontinental Cup. Argentine clubs have won the tournament a record 9 times.

In 1978, Argentina hosted the World Cup, where the team defeated the Netherlands 3–1 after extra time in the final to win their first World Cup.

In 1979, a young Diego Maradona was part of the Argentina under-20 team which won the FIFA Under-20 World Cup. Argentina have gone on to win a record six U-20 World Cups.

In 1982, due to an uncertain political atmosphere and an extremely unstable government with multiple presidents over the span of a short time, most football clubs were lacking the money to keep top domestic players. 1982 saw a whole slew of players leave Argentina for Europe: players like Diego Maradona, Mario Kempes (who had already played in Spain and had briefly returned to Argentina), Daniel Passarella and many others leave for Spain, France, Italy or England.

In 1986, Argentina would win their second World Cup in the 1986 World Cup, where the team defeated to Germany 3–2.

In 1995, Rosario Central became the first club not based in Buenos Aires or Greater Buenos Aires to win an international cup recognised by FIFA, the Conmebol Cup. Argentine clubs have won the tournament a record three times.

In 2004, the Argentina Olympic football team won Gold at the Athens Olympic games; they defended their title in 2008 to become the first team to defend the Olympic football title since Hungary in 1968.

In 2022, Argentina won the World Cup for the third time, beating France 4–2 on penalties following a 3–3 draw after extra time.

 Clubs 

 League system 

Around 326 registered football clubs play in the Argentine Football Association (AFA) league system, which is organized in a pyramid of seven leagues divided from the third level between clubs directly affiliated to AFA and clubs indirectly affiliated to AFA. In the branch of clubs indirectly affiliated to AFA below the fourth level, there are 250 other Regional Leagues that are affiliated with AFA and compete for the right to enter the league system at the lowest tier.

The Primera División is the highest level of club football in Argentina. It was founded in 1891 as an amateur competition, becoming professional in 1931 with a league by 18 teams which were dissatisfied with the amateur system they were participating on until 1930. This group of 18 founding members of the present league included nearly all of the most prominent clubs of those times, unified by the idea that full and compulsory amateurism was no longer sustainable (many of those teams are still today among the most popular clubs in Argentina). For many years, the only winners were the so-called "big five" (Boca Juniors, Independiente, Racing Club, River Plate and San Lorenzo de Almagro). This dominance was finally broken in 1967 by Estudiantes de La Plata. Since then, ten other teams have won the championship, resulting in a total of 28 teams having been champions of Argentina as of 2021. River Plate has won the most championships with 37. The only teams outside the Buenos Aires and Greater Buenos Aires to have won the championship are Rosario Central and Newell's Old Boys from Rosario, Estudiantes and Gimnasia y Esgrima from La Plata.

Below the second division, Primera Nacional, the league system is regionalized with three divisions for clubs directly affiliated to AFA of Buenos Aires, Greater Buenos Aires and twenty one clubs from the cities of Rosario, Santa Fe, La Plata, Zarate, Campana, Luján, Junín, General Rodríguez, Cañuelas, Pilar and Mercedes; and two divisions for clubs indirectly affiliated to AFA that cover the rest of the country. Even below these seven leagues, Argentine football is regionalized into almost 250 Regional Leagues, which consist of teams that participate in championships and tournaments organized by the Consejo Federal del Fútbol Argentino (es) (CFFA), internal organ of the Argentine Football Association (AFA), to obtain the right to enter the Torneo Regional Federal Amateur, established in 2018.

 League championships 

The Primera División has been using different formats for its championships, from a double round-robin tournament (1891 to 1966) to a single round-robin that would become the standard in Latin America, the Apertura and Clausura. In the particular case of Argentina, the Apertura was contested in the second half of the calendar year, and the Clausura was played in the first half of the following year (in order to synchronize the seasons with those of the European football). Different formats used also included the organization of Metropolitano and Nacional championships, that lasted from 1967 to 1985.

As of 2021 season, the Argentine Primera División league is made up of 26 teams, with a championship organized in a single round-robin schedule, resulting in a total of 25 rounds per team. Six teams from Argentina are eligible to play the Copa Libertadores, four from the league championship and the rest from the Copa Argentina and Copa de la Superliga.

From 1891 to date, River Plate is the most winning team with 37 domestic championships, followed by Boca Juniors with 35 titles. Racing holds the third position with 18 titles.

 Domestic cups 

Since the creation of the first league in 1891, several cups have been played in Argentine apart from the main competition, the Primera División. The first cup held in the country was the Copa de Honor Municipalidad de Buenos Aires; first contested in 1905, it was played until 1936.

As of the present, four domestic cups are held in Argentina: the Copa Argentina, that includes teams of all divisions of Argentine football, and the Supercopa Argentina –contested by the reigning champions of Primera División and Copa Argentina, organised by the AFA. The third one is Copa de la Superliga Argentina, organised by the Superliga Argentina body. The Trofeo de Campeones is the fourth official cup organized by the Superliga Argentina. The annual football match was played for the first time in 2019, being played by the champions of Primera División and Copa de la Superliga Argentina respectively

The Copa Campeonato, originally awarded to Primera División champion, is the oldest trophy of Argentine football, having been established in 1896, three year after the AFA was created, and played without interruption until 1926. The Cup received several names, such as "Championship Cup", "Copa Campeonato", "Challenge Cup" and "Copa Alumni", due to the association offered legendary team Alumni to keep the Cup definitely for having won it three consecutive times (1900–02), but the club from Belgrano declined the honour to keep the trophy under dispute."Una Copa con mucha historia", Diario Uno, 27 Jun 2013

All those competitions, although not considered league tournaments, are regarded as official titles.

 Rivalries 

There are many local rivalries in Argentine football. The most important is the Superderby, which is contested between Argentina's two most popular and successful teams, Buenos Aires rivals River Plate and Boca Juniors. The English newspaper The Observer put the superclásico (name in Spanish) at the top of their list of "The 50 Sporting Things You Must Do Before You Die".

The second-most important rivalry in Argentine football is the Avellaneda derby, which is contested between Independiente and Racing, the third- and fourth-most popular and third- and fourth-most successful teams of the country (respectively), both from the city of Avellaneda (located next to Buenos Aires, into it metropolitan area). Other important derbies include the derby between Huracán and San Lorenzo de Almagro (has no particular denomination), the Rosario derby (between Newell's Old Boys and Rosario Central), the La Plata derby (between Estudiantes de La Plata and Gimnasia y Esgrima La Plata), the West derby (between Ferro Carril Oeste and Vélez Sarsfield), the derby between Atlanta and Chacarita Juniors (formerly denominated "Villa Crespo derby"), the Santa Fe derby (between Colón and Unión), the North Zone derby (between Platense and Tigre), the Cordoba derby (between Belgrano and Talleres), the derby between Instituto and Racing de Córdoba (has no particular denomination) and the Tucuman derby (between San Martín and Atlético Tucumán).

 Style of Play 

Circumstances allowed the wide development of a special style, called "pasture football", little regulated, often massive, without coaches, captains or parents. This includes a variety of soccer games, from more or less formal matches, to mass informal matches such as "el picado", or games such as "goal-goal-enter", the "loco", the "run", the " center-goal ", the" cañito-la liga ", the" football-tennis ", the" coca-cola ", the" head ", and so on. These conditions promoted a game based fundamentally on improvisation and individual skill in handling the ball, the so-called "art of dribbling" (dribbling), and the short pass, as well as a more physical and violent defensive game, with resource systematic to the old law of British premodern football, "hacking" or trip, known in the Río de la Plata as "ax".

 Clubs at international competitions 

The first international club competition was organized by both, Argentine and Uruguayan associations, with the establishment of Tie Cup or "Copa de Competencia Chevallier Boutell" in 1900. The tournament was held until 1919. Several competitions between teams from both countries followed, being the last the Copa Aldao, which last edition was played in 1955.

The most successful Argentine club on the international stage is Boca Juniors. The club has won a total of 22 international titles. Three of its wins are the Intercontinental Cup titles of 1977, 2000 and 2003.

Independiente has won the most important continental title on the most occasions, its seven Copa Libertadores titles is a record, as is its feat of winning the title on four consecutive occasions (1972–75). Also, Independiente was the most successful club on international cups by more than twenty years. These achievements earned them the nickname of Rey de Copas (King of Cups).

A number of other Argentine clubs have won the Copa Libertadores, including Estudiantes de La Plata and River Plate (four times each; Estudiantes in 1968, 1969, 1970, 2009 and River Plate in 1986, 1996, 2015, 2018), Racing (1967), Argentinos Juniors (1985), Vélez Sarsfield (1994) and San Lorenzo (2014).

Some Argentine teams have won international titles without having won a Primera División title, such as Talleres de Córdoba that won the Copa CONMEBOL in 1999, Arsenal de Sarandí winning the Copa Sudamericana in 2007 (although the team then won a title, the 2012 Torneo Clausura) and Defensa y Justicia winning the Copa Sudamericana in 2020.

 List of international competitions (1900–present) 
Argentine clubs have taken part of the following international club competitions, in order of appearance:

 Culture 
Football plays an important part in the life of many Argentines. Even those supporters who usually do not attend the matches watch them on television and comment on them the next day with friends and co-workers. When the Argentina national football team plays (especially during world cup matches), streets tend to look completely deserted as everyone is watching the match. After the victories in 1978 FIFA World Cup and 1986 FIFA World Cup, streets were flooded with people celebrating the championship, making it impossible not to become part of the celebration.

It was in 1986 when the figure of Diego Maradona exploded, becoming an icon not only of Argentine football but of football itself. In Argentina, Maradona became something resemblant of a god (see Maradonian Church), admired by fans of every club (even River Plate).

Supporters in Argentinian football stadiums operate under a key principle known as Aguante (Endurance) which serves as a belief system that guides the behavior of those in attendance. Key values that make up aguante that scholars such as Eduardo Herrera have also claimed are central in the construction of Argentinian masculinity are courage, endurance, and fearlessness in physical confrontation. Fans can showcase these values when they are at stadiums in three significant way which are always supporting your team with your participation in chants and jumping throughout the match, attending literally every match that your team plays regardless of the circumstances, and standing your ground in the face of opposition insults or when engaged in any physical altercations at the stadium.
It is under this principal of aguante that those in attendance of stadium matches in Argentina can be labeled under three broad categories which are hinchas (Fans), hinchinda militantes (militant fans), and espectadores (spectator). Those who classified as Hinchas exhibit many of the qualities under the aguante principle and often go to many of their team's matches, while hinchinda militantes who are usually found behind the goals with their team colors strictly follow what is asked of them under aguante by attending every of their team's matches regardless of the weather or performance of the team. The espectadores attend matches to enjoy the play of the game but do not weigh the principal of aguante close to heart compared the other two fan categories. Within the broad category of hinchinda militantes it is made up of la barra (supporters), la banda (the band), los pibes (the kids), and la pandilla (gang).La Barra is the central figure within the hinchinda militantes because of the critical role these subgroups of fans have in shaping the atmosphere of the stadium during matches and lead under a hierarchical structure with a capo (boss) at the top who organizes and tropes(followers) who heed the direction/instructions of the capo. The leadership of these organized subgroups of fans, which are mainly made up of men between the ages of 15–50 years old, are entirely driven by demonstrations of aguante and awarded additional benefits stemming from relationships with club executives that grant special privileges to these groups such as tickets or allowing them to bring in typically prohibited items into the stadium to stir energy and excitement for the football club during the match. 
The excitement and passion at stadiums are typically found to be instigated and sustained by the presence of the percussion and brass instrument brought in by barras groups. The typical percussion instruments that are brought in and played by members of the barras at stadiums are the bombo con platillo (bass drum), Brazilian surdo drums, redoblantes (snare drums), repiques, scrappers, tambourines, cowbells, and agogo bells. The brass instruments that are typically played at stadiums by outside musicians hired by barras groups are trumpets, trombones, and euphoniums. While the collective energy and synchronization incited by the music can create a sense of unity among attendants and supporters alike, ethnomusicological scholar Eduardo Herrera also believes that they can embolden individuals to normalize discriminatory behavior that they wouldn't otherwise do if they weren't in a crowd, which would explain some of the recorded derogatory language and violent behavior found in Argentinian stadiums.

Argentine fans are not allowed to travel to see their teams in away matches, as they have been banned since 2013.Hinchas (supporters) create an emotional ambiance in many stadiums, singing and cheering loudly all game long, but since the away fan ban due to violence, the atmosphere in many stadia has become poorer, with goals for away teams greeted by silence and the disappearance of round trip chants between home and away fans, that provoked in each side to sing louder for show more passion.Barra bravas'' (Argentine organized groups – like the English hooligan firms) also create occasional problems, usually in riots after the match.

+50,000-capacity Argentine football stadiums

See also 
 English Argentines
 Sport in Argentina

References

External links 

 Argentine Football Association